Fayyadh bin Hamed bin Raqed Al Ruwaili (born 27 April 1958) is a Saudi Arabian pilot and general who has served as the commander of the Royal Saudi Air Force (RSAF) on two occasions, most recently since a shakeup of the military high command on 26 February 2018 by King Salman. Before that he served as the commander of the RSAF from 10 May 2013 until 14 May 2014. In between that, from 2014 until his new re-appointment in 2018 as RSAF commander, time he served as the deputy chief of the Saudi general staff. Al Ruwaili hails from a merchant family near the Red Sea.

References

|-

Royal Saudi Air Force personnel
1958 births
Living people